Rime ice forms when supercooled water liquid droplets freeze onto the surfaces. Meteorologists distinguish between three basic types of ice forming on vertical and horizontal surfaces by deposition of supercooled water droplets. There are also intermediate formations.
Soft rime is less dense than hard rime and is milky and crystalline, like sugar. Soft rime appears similar to hoar frost.
Hard rime is somewhat less milky, especially if it is not heavy.
Clear ice is transparent and homogeneous. The ice resembles ice-cube ice in appearance. [citation needed] The dense structure helps the ice cling to any surface on which it forms.

Both rime types are less dense than clear ice and cling less, therefore damage due to rime is generally less than damage from clear ice. Glaze ice is similar in appearance to clear ice. Glaze ice is the result of a completely different process, occurring during freezing rain or drizzle.

Rime ice also forms when ice forms on the surface of an aircraft, particularly on the leading edges and control surfaces, when it flies through a cloud made of supercooled water liquid droplets. Rime ice is the least dense, milky ice is intermediate and clear ice is the most dense. All forms of ice can spoil lift and may have a catastrophic effect on an airborne aircraft. Ice is hazardous to flight as it disrupts airflow, increases weight, and adds drag. Ice forming on propellers or engine inlets can cause severe vibration and/or damage if ingested.

Origin of name
The word 'Rime' comes from Middle English - rime, ryme, rim, from Old English - hrīm, from Proto-West Germanic - *hrīm, from Proto-Germanic - *hrīmaz, *hrīmą (“hoarfrost”), from Proto-Indo-European - *krey- (“to streak; graze; touch”).

Hard rime

Hard rime is a white ice that forms when the water droplets in fog freeze to the outer surfaces of objects. It is often seen on trees atop mountains and ridges in winter, when low-hanging clouds cause freezing fog.

Characteristics
Hard rime formations are more difficult to remove. They have a comb-like appearance, unlike soft rime, which looks feathery or spiky, or clear ice, which looks homogeneous and transparent.

Scientists at meteorologically extreme places such as Mount Washington in New Hampshire often have to break huge chunks of hard rime off weather equipment, in order to keep anemometers and other measuring instruments operating.

Formation on snow crystals

Under some atmospheric conditions, forming and descending snow crystals may encounter and pass via atmospheric supercooled cloud droplets. These droplets, which have a diameter of about 10 μm, can exist in the unfrozen state down to temperatures near −40 °C (−40 °F). Contact between the snow crystal and the supercooled droplets results in the freezing of the liquid droplets onto the surface of the crystals. This process of crystal growth is known as accretion. Crystals that exhibit frozen droplets on their surfaces are referred to as rimed. When this process continues to the point that the shape of the original snow crystal is no longer identifiable, the resulting crystal gets referred to as graupel.

The frozen droplets on the surface of rimed crystals are hard to resolve and the topography of a graupel particle is not easy to record with a visible-wavelength microscope because of the limited resolution and depth of field in the instrument. However, observations of snow crystals with a low-temperature scanning electron microscope (LT-SEM) clearly show cloud droplets measuring up to 50 μm on the surface of the crystals. The rime has been observed on all four basic forms of snow crystals, including plates, dendrites, columns and needles. As the riming process continues, the mass of frozen, accumulated cloud droplets obscures the identity of the original snow crystal, giving rise to a graupel particle.

Soft rime

Soft rime is a white ice deposition that forms when the water droplets in light freezing fog or mist freeze to the outer surfaces of objects, with calm or light wind. The fog freezes usually to the windward side of tree branches, wires, or any other solid objects. 

Soft rime is similar in appearance to hoar frost; but while rime is formed by vapour first condensing to liquid droplets (of fog, mist or cloud) and then attaching to a surface, hoar frost is formed by direct deposition from water vapour to solid ice. A heavy coating of hoar frost, called white frost, is very similar in appearance to soft rime, but the formation process is different; it happens when there is no fog, but very high levels of air relative humidity (above 90%) and temperatures below . 

Soft rime formations appear as white ice needles and scales; they are fragile and can be easily shaken off objects. Factors that favour soft rime are small drop size: the slow accretion of liquid water, a high degree of supercooling, and fast dissipation of latent heat of fusion. The opposite conditions favour ice with higher densities, such as hard rime or clear ice.

See also
 Atmospheric icing

References

External links

Search Hard Rime in Glossary, American Meteorological Society
Soft Rime in Glossary, American Meteorological Society 
Weather Facts, WeatherOnline

Water ice
Frost and rime